Lindsay Davenport was the defending champion, but lost in quarterfinals to Kim Clijsters.

Clijsters defeated Daniela Hantuchová 4–6, 6–3, 6–4 in the final. She received a Porsche Boxster-S as a prize.

Seeds
The first four seeds received a bye into the second round.

Draw

Finals

Top half

Bottom half

References

External links
 Official results archive (ITF)
 Official results archive (WTA)

Porsche Tennis Grand Prix Singles
2002 Women's Singles